Czarny Las  is a village in the administrative district of Gmina Grodzisk Mazowiecki, within Grodzisk Mazowiecki County, Masovian Voivodeship, in east-central Poland.

References

Sołectwo Czarny Las: http://czarnylas.grodzisk.pl

Czarny Las